Greensburg Community High School is a high school located in Greensburg, Indiana.

See also
 List of high schools in Indiana
 Eastern Indiana Athletic Conference
 Greensburg, Indiana

References

External links
Official Website

Public high schools in Indiana
Buildings and structures in Decatur County, Indiana